Nevskia ramosa is a mesophilic proteobacterium from the genus Nevskia. Famintsyn first described it from a sample of a botanical garden's aquarium water in St. Petersburg, Russia. Typically, its microcolonies resemble characteristic flat rosettes with a bush-like appearance on the surface of water. It has been isolated from a bog lake in Greifswald, Germany.

References

Bacteria described in 1892
Xanthomonadales